Thomas Hyde (29 June 163618 February 1703) was an English linguist, historian, librarian, classicist, and orientalist. His chief work was the 1700  [On the Ancient Religion of the Persians], the first attempt to use Arab and Persian sources to correct the errors of Greek and Roman historians in their descriptions of Zoroastrianism and the other beliefs of the ancient Persians.

Life

He was born at Billingsley, near Bridgnorth in Shropshire, on 29 June 1636. He inherited his taste for linguistic studies, and received his first lessons in some of the Eastern tongues, from his father, who was rector of the parish.

Hyde was educated at Eton College, and in his sixteenth year entered King's College, Cambridge. There, under Abraham Wheelock, professor of Arabic, he made rapid progress in Oriental languages, so that, after only one year of residence, he was invited to London to assist Brian Walton in his edition of the Polyglott Bible. Besides correcting the Arabic, Persic and Syriac texts for that work, Hyde transcribed into Persic characters the Persian translation of the Pentateuch, which had been printed in Hebrew letters at Constantinople in 1546. To this work, which Archbishop Ussher had thought well-nigh impossible even for a native of Persia, Hyde appended the Latin version which accompanies it in the Polyglott.

In 1658 he was chosen Hebrew reader at Queen's College, Oxford, and in 1659, in consideration of his erudition in Oriental tongues, he was admitted to the degree of M.A. In the same year he was appointed under-keeper of the Bodleian Library, and in 1665 librarian-in-chief. Next year he was collated to a prebend at Salisbury, and in 1673 to the archdeaconry of Gloucester, receiving the degree of D.D. shortly afterwards.  As librarian, Hyde was responsible for the publication of the Catalogus impressorum Librorum Bibliothecae Bodleianae (1674) [Catalog of the Printed Books in the Bodleian Library], the third published catalogue of the Bodleian collections.

In 1691 the death of Edward Pococke opened up to Hyde the Laudian professorship of Arabic; and in 1697, on the deprivation of Roger Altham, he succeeded to the Regius chair of Hebrew and a canonry of Christ Church.

Under Charles II, James II and William III, Hyde discharged the duties of Eastern interpreter to the court. He resigned his librarianship in 1701, giving as a reason, "my feet being left weak by the gout, I am weary of the toil and drudgery of daily attendance all times and weathers." He died at Oxford on 18 February 1703, aged 66.

Works
Hyde was an assiduous classical scholar and linguist who helped popularize Orientalism and the study of Asian history in Britain. He learned Chinese from the Chinese Jesuit Michael Shen and wrote in and translated Turkish, Arabic, Syriac, Persian, Hebrew, and Malay. His chief work was the 1700  [On the Ancient Religion of the Persians], the first attempt to use Arab and Persian sources to correct the errors of Greek and Roman historians in their descriptions of Zoroastrianism and the other beliefs of the ancient Persians. He identified Zoroaster as a religious reformer. Like Engelbert Kaempfer, he is sometimes mistakenly credited with coining the word "cuneiform". He is similarly sometimes credited with coining "dualism".

His writings and translations include:
 , a translation of the c. 1438 Zij-i Sultani
 , a combination of the separate translations of the Dutchmen A.C. Ruyl, J. Van Heurn, and J. Van Hasel with an English foreward by Hyde introducing the Malay language, its orthography, and its grammar.
 .
 , a translation of Abraham Farissol's 1524 Iggeret Orḥot 'Olam.
 .
 .

These include coan ki and a confused account of weiqi (i.e., go) which includes the first Latin mention of the game's concept of "eyes". The  was republished by Hunt and Costard in 1760. The other worksincluding some previously unpublished manuscriptswere collected, edited, and published by Gregory Sharpe in 1767 under the title . Sharpe also provided a biography of Hyde in his work.

See also
 List of chess historians

Notes

External links

1636 births
1703 deaths
17th-century Latin-language writers
Alumni of King's College, Cambridge
Bodley's Librarians
Christian Hebraists
English librarians
English orientalists
Tabletop game writers
Chess historians
Writers from Shropshire
People educated at Eton College
Laudian Professors of Arabic
Regius Professors of Hebrew (University of Oxford)